Emiliano Gómez Vizcarra (born March 2, 1991, in Mexico City) is a Mexican professional footballer who last played for Cafetaleros de Tapachula.

References

External links
 

1991 births
Living people
Mexican footballers
Association football midfielders
Pioneros de Cancún footballers
Inter Playa del Carmen players
Cafetaleros de Chiapas footballers
Ascenso MX players
Liga Premier de México players
Footballers from Mexico City